Zudikey Rodríguez Núñez (born 14 March 1987 in Valle de Bravo, State of Mexico) is a Mexican sprinter and hurdler. Her personal best time for the 200 metres is 23.18 seconds, achieved in May 2007 in Puebla.

Then she moved up a distance to run 400 metres. She was member of the silver medal-winning Mexican 4×400 relay team at the 2007 Pan American Games. She also placed eighth in the 2007 World Championships in Athletics and represented Mexico at the 2008 Summer Olympics.

In 2010, she switched to the 400 metres hurdles event. In her first competitive race, she set a Mexican record of 56.10 seconds (previous record was 57.78 by Mayra González). She went on to become the hurdles champion at the 2010 Ibero-American Championships in Athletics.

During the 2010 Central American and Caribbean Games where she won the silver in the 400 meters hurdles and bronze in the 4 x 400 meters relay, she tested positive for a banned substance, methylhexanamine, commonly used as nasal decongestant, she was consequently suspended for six months from 3 August 2010 to 4 February 2011.

Personal bests

International competitions

1: Doping.

References

External links

1987 births
Living people
Sportspeople from the State of Mexico
Mexican female sprinters
Mexican female hurdlers
Olympic athletes of Mexico
Athletes (track and field) at the 2008 Summer Olympics
Pan American Games medalists in athletics (track and field)
Athletes (track and field) at the 2007 Pan American Games
Athletes (track and field) at the 2011 Pan American Games
World Athletics Championships athletes for Mexico
Doping cases in athletics
Mexican sportspeople in doping cases
Pan American Games silver medalists for Mexico
Central American and Caribbean Games gold medalists for Mexico
Competitors at the 2010 Central American and Caribbean Games
Competitors at the 2014 Central American and Caribbean Games
Competitors at the 2018 Central American and Caribbean Games
Central American and Caribbean Games medalists in athletics
Competitors at the 2007 Summer Universiade
Medalists at the 2007 Pan American Games